Nesta Rugumayo (died 1972) was a Ugandan nutritionist and community developer. She was the mother of Prince Robert Masamba Kimera with Mutesa II, the 35th Kabaka of Buganda. She later married Edward Rugumayo.

Early life
She was born Nesta Mukeri in the Kingdom of Tooro. She was a Mutooro.

Education and career
In 1962, the Associated Country Women of the World (ACWW) awarded her the first Lady Aberdeen Scholarship. She spent a year at the London School of Hygiene and Tropical Medicine. In London, she began a lifelong friendship with Irene Spry, who shared her commitment to development.

Upon her return to Uganda, she worked for the Ministry of Community Development to increase awareness among women in rural communities about the nutritional needs of children. She was fully engaged in Uganda's development.”

Death
Rugumayo died in 1972.

References

Bibliography
 

1971 deaths
20th-century Ugandan women scientists
Alumni of the London School of Hygiene & Tropical Medicine
Ugandan royalty
Ugandan people in health professions